Knik TV Mast, located near Knik, Alaska, is a  tall guyed mast used for FM radio and television broadcasting.  The mast is operated by Alaska Public Telecommunications, Inc.  The mast gained the distinction as the tallest structure in Alaska, following the April 28, 2010 demolition of the  guyed mast at LORAN-C transmitter Port Clarence.

The following transmitters are radiated:

Television

FM radio

External links
 http://www.fcc.gov/fcc-bin/fmq?state=&call=&city=&arn=&serv=&vac=&freq=0.0&fre2=107.9&facid=&class=&dkt=&list=1&dist=1&dlat2=61&mlat2=25&slat2=20&NS=N&dlon2=149&mlon2=52&slon2=28&EW=W&size=9
 http://wireless2.fcc.gov/UlsApp/AsrSearch/asrRegistration.jsp?regKey=112366

1986 establishments in Alaska
Buildings and structures in Matanuska-Susitna Borough, Alaska
Towers in Alaska